Moorhouse Chantry Chapel is a Grade II* listed Church of England chapel in the Diocese of Southwell and Nottingham at Moorhouse, within the Laxton and Moorhouse civil parish, Nottinghamshire.

History

The church dates 1860, built by Henry Clutton for Evelyn Denison, 1st Viscount Ossington in the 12th century French Gothic Revival style.

It is in a group of parishes comprising:
St Swithin’s Church, Wellow
St Bartholomew’s Church, Kneesall
St Michael the Archangel's Church, Laxton

References

Church of England church buildings in Nottinghamshire
Churches completed in 1860
Gothic Revival church buildings in England
Gothic Revival architecture in Nottinghamshire
Grade II* listed churches in Nottinghamshire